Losees Hill is a mountain located in the Catskill Mountains of New York southeast of Ellenville. Mount Don Bosco is located north, and Mount Meenahga is located northwest of Losees Hill.

References

Mountains of Ulster County, New York
Mountains of New York (state)